Reencontro com Sambalanço Trio is the fourth album recorded by Sambalanço Trio. It was released on an LP in 1965 and presents a fusion of samba and jazz.

In 2006 this album was reissued on CD as part of the Som Livre Masters series organized by Charles Gavin.

Track listing

The seventh track, "Pout-pourri", is composed by pieces of other seven songs listed below the track.

Personnel
Cesar Camargo Mariano - piano
Humberto Clayber - bass
Airto Moreira - drums

References

1965 albums
Sambalanço Trio albums